Robert Stewart (14 April 1924 – February 1995) was a Scottish designer. He worked in many media but was primarily known for his textile designs. He was a contemporary of Lucienne Day and together they pioneered modern British textile design after the war. He taught at the Glasgow School of Art for 35 years.

References

Scottish designers
1924 births
1995 deaths
Academics of the Glasgow School of Art